Nampa Municipal Airport  is a city-owned public airport in Nampa, in Canyon County, Idaho. The FAA's National Plan of Integrated Airport Systems for 2009–2013 called it a general aviation airport.

It is used for private, emergency, military and industrial aviation and is home to the Warhawk Air Museum. The airport has ongoing hangar construction. The Civil Air Patrol Nampa Squadron is on airport grounds co-located with EAA in the Shep-Rock hangar. Nampa Municipal Airport is a member of Rocky Mountain Air and the Snake River Flight Training Club. Mission Aviation Fellowship is also headquartered at the Nampa Airport.

Most U.S. airports use the same three-letter location identifier for the FAA and IATA, but this airport is assigned MAN by the FAA and has no designation from the IATA (which assigned MAN to
Manchester Airport in Manchester, England, United Kingdom).

Facilities and aircraft 
It has one asphalt runway, 11/29, 5,000 by 75 feet (1,524 x 23 m).

In the year ending June 20, 2007 the airport had 105,600 aircraft operations, average 289 per day: 98.5% general aviation and 1.5% air taxi. 277 aircraft were then based at this airport: 86.6% single-engine, 2.9% multi-engine, 2.5% helicopter, 4% glider and 4% ultralight.

Services 
Services are for pilots only. Some services include cheap aircraft stowing, pilot service (such as a lounge, internet access, and rentals), and transportation. The airport also offers full service during business hours. Upstairs in the Ops building is the Tower Grill. The restaurant is open to the public.

References

External links 
 Nampa Municipal Airport page at City of Nampa website
 Nampa Municipal Airport at Idaho Transportation Department
 Aerial image as of 25 May 1992 from USGS The National Map
 Warhawk Air Museum

Airports in Idaho
Buildings and structures in Canyon County, Idaho
Transportation in Canyon County, Idaho